Tilt is a 2011 Bulgarian drama film directed by Viktor Chouchkov. The film was selected as the Bulgarian entry for the Best Foreign Language Film at the 84th Academy Awards, but it did not make the final shortlist.

Plot
The film is set in the early 1990s and tells the story of four friends who are trying to make money with the dream to open their own bar, to be called TILT. A chance meeting between Stash (Yavor Baharoff) and Becky (Radina Kardjilova) brings them to a passionate love affair. 

Suddenly, they are caught illegally distributing porn films. Becky's father, a police colonel, takes charge of the case and threatens them with prison. The only way to avoid going to jail is for Stash and Becky to stop seeing each other. They decide to run away to a small German village. Being poor emigrants, they find themselves in a series of funny and absurd situations. Stash is constantly trying to reach Becky, but with no luck. The four friends finally decide to go back to Bulgaria. Meanwhile, Bulgaria has changed, and so has Becky.

Cast
 Yavor Baharov as Stash
 Radina Kardjilova as Becky
 Ovanes Torosian as Gogo
 Alexander Sano as B-Gum
 Ivaylo Dragiev as Angel
 Phillip Avramov as Snake
 Joreta Nikolova as Stash's Mother
 Georgi Staykov as Katev
 Georgi Novakov as Grigorov
 Robert Yanakiev as Sgt. Manolov
 Max Reimann as Bar Owner
 Alexander Hegedush as Pizza
 Thomas Frahm as Shopkeeper
 Sabine Neumann as German Girl
 Britta Fleischhut as German Girl

Release
After it premiered in Bulgaria in February, the film was screened at ten international film festivals, including Santa Barbara, Goteborg, Montreal, Singapore, Raindance (London) and Woodstock. Tilt has been very positively received in the USA where it has been selected for five festivals, including the Seattle International Film Festival.

The film won the Best Editing Award at the Woodstock Film Festival. It has also won Best Main Actor, Best Supporting Actor and the Special Jury Award at Golden Rose Film Festival.

See also
 List of submissions to the 84th Academy Awards for Best Foreign Language Film
 List of Bulgarian submissions for the Academy Award for Best Foreign Language Film

References

External links
 

2011 films
2010s Bulgarian-language films
2011 drama films
Films shot in Bulgaria
Bulgarian drama films